Alfonso Pons Ezquerra (Barcelona 9 November 1959), better known as Sito Pons, is a Spanish former professional Grand Prix motorcycle racer. He competed in the FIM motorcycle Grand Prix world championships from 1981 to 1991. Pons is notable for winning two consecutive 250cc road racing world championships in 1988 and 1989.

After retiring from competition, Pons created the Honda-Pons Racing team in MotoGP, which had as its riders the likes of Loris Capirossi, Alex Barros, Max Biaggi and Troy Bayliss. He was forced to disband the team before the 2006 season due to a lack of funding.

Pons also turned to auto racing, fielding a team in the World Series by Renault, which was mostly based in Spain. His team won the 2004 championship with driver Heikki Kovalainen. Pons returned to motorcycle racing in the 2010 Moto2 championship, fielding riders Sergio Gadea and his son, Axel Pons.

In 1990 he was awarded the Prince of Asturias Award for his achievements in sports.

Personal life
Pons is the father of Axel and Edgar Pons.

Motorcycle Grand Prix results
Points system from 1969 to 1987:

Points system from 1988 to 1991:

(key) (Races in bold indicate pole position; races in italics indicate fastest lap)

References

External links 
 Pons Racing web site

1959 births
Living people
Motorcycle racers from Catalonia
Spanish motorcycle racers
Motorcycle racing team owners
250cc World Championship riders
500cc World Championship riders
Sportspeople from Barcelona
250cc World Riders' Champions